The Cardiff United Synagogue is an Orthodox Jewish synagogue in the Cyncoed suburb of Cardiff, Wales.
The synagogue maintains daily prayer services, led by Rabbi Michoel Rose.
The synagogue also provides educational classes, youth and festivals programming and is instrumental in interfaith work in South Wales.

History

A Jewish community existed in Cardiff by 1841, when the Marquess of Bute donated land at Highfield for a Jewish Cemetery. The congregation, which is the result of the merger of several historic congregations, traces its roots to the Old Hebrew Congregation, which erected a synagogue building on Trinity Street in  1853, and to the Bute Street synagogue of  1858. Bute Street was the centre of the Jewish community in the nineteenth century.

Former locations and ancestral congregations in Cardiff include the following:

Original (Old Hebrew) congregation,
Trinity Street, Cardiff (1853–1858)
East Terrace, Bute Street, Cardiff (1858–1897; redeveloped 1888)
Cathedral Road, Cardiff (1897–1989)
New (Orthodox) congregation,
Edwards Place, Cardiff (1889–1900)
Merches Place, Cardiff (1900–?)
Windsor Place congregation, Windsor Place, Cardiff (1918–1955)

Penylan congregation, Ty Gwyn Road, Penylan (1955–2003)

The most architecturally distinguished of the several historic synagogue buildings was the classical/eclectic synagogue in Windsor Place. One of the congregation's former buildings was purchased in 1979 and converted into a Hindu temple. With the diminution of the Cardiff Jewish community and a drift away from the older neighborhoods, these congregations consolidated in the present, modern building in Cyncoed Gardens, Cyncoed, dedicated by Chief Rabbi Jonathan Sacks in 2003.

Notable members
Joe Jacobson (born 1986), footballer

See also
 Cardiff Reform Synagogue

References

External links
 Official website in English 
Official website in Hebrew
 Cardiff United Synagogue on Jewish Communities and Records – UK (hosted by jewishgen.org).
 Article relating to the (old) Cathedral Road Synagogue Times of Israel August 15,2021

Orthodox synagogues in the United Kingdom
Synagogues in Wales
Religious buildings and structures in Cardiff